In mathematics, more precisely in the theory of functions of several complex variables, a pseudoconvex set is a special type of open set in the n-dimensional complex space Cn. Pseudoconvex sets are important, as they allow for classification of domains of holomorphy. 

Let  

be a domain, that is, an open connected subset. One says that  is pseudoconvex (or Hartogs pseudoconvex) if there exists a continuous plurisubharmonic function  on  such that the set  

Every (geometrically) convex set is pseudoconvex. However, there are pseudoconvex domains which are not geometrically convex.

, we have

The definition above is analogous to definitions of convexity in Real Analysis.

If  does not have a  boundary, the following approximation result can be useful. 

The case n = 1

In one complex dimension, every open domain is pseudoconvex. The concept of pseudoconvexity is thus more useful in dimensions higher than 1.

See also

 Analytic polyhedron
 Eugenio Elia Levi
 Holomorphically convex hull
 Stein manifold

References

 
 Lars Hörmander, An Introduction to Complex Analysis in Several Variables, North-Holland, 1990..
 Steven G. Krantz. Function Theory of Several Complex Variables, AMS Chelsea Publishing, Providence, Rhode Island, 1992.

External links

 
 

Several complex variables